Alghadeer TV is an Iraqi satellite television channel based in Baghdad, Iraq. The channel was launched in 2003. The channel is owned by the Badr Organization.

See also

Television in Iraq

References

External links
 Alghadeer TV Official website

Badr Organization
Television stations in Iraq
Arab mass media
Arabic-language television stations
Television channels and stations established in 2003
Arab Spring and the media